The Los Angeles Angels are a Major League Baseball franchise based in Anaheim, California. They play in the American League West division. Since the institution of Major League Baseball's Rule 4 Draft in 1965, the Angels have selected 62 players in the first round. Officially known as the "First-Year Player Draft", the Rule 4 Draft is Major League Baseball's primary mechanism for assigning amateur players from high schools, colleges, and other amateur clubs to its teams. The draft order is determined based on the previous season's standings, with the team possessing the worst record receiving the first pick. In addition, teams which lost free agents in the previous off-season may be awarded compensatory or supplementary picks.

Of the 66 players drafted by the Angels, 29 have been pitchers, the most of any position; 18 of these were right-handed, while 11 were left-handed. Fourteen outfielders, eight shortstops, four third basemen, and four first basemen were also taken. No second basemen have been selected. Thirteen of the players came from high schools or universities in the state of California, while Florida follows with six players. Four players have been selected from both Illinois and Georgia. All players selected have been from the United States. The franchise has made five selections in the same draft three times, in 1986, 2009, and 2010.

Two Angels first-round picks, outfielder Darin Erstad (1995) and third basemen Troy Glaus (1997), played with the 2002 World Series championship team. Outfielder Mike Trout, who was chosen in 2009 and has spent his entire MLB career to date with the Angels, was named American League Rookie of the Year in 2012, and finished no worse than second in voting for American League Most Valuable Player in each of his first five full seasons with the Angels, winning that award in 2014 and 2016. Pitcher Jim Abbott (1988), born without a right hand, won the 1987 Golden Spikes Award while playing at the University of Michigan, and the 1992 Tony Conigliaro Award and the 1995 Hutch Award while with the Angels. Danny Goodwin (1975), who was picked first overall in 1971 by the Chicago White Sox but opted for four years of college, is the only player to be selected first in the draft on two separate occasions.

The team has made 13 selections in the supplemental round of the draft and 21 compensatory picks since the institution of the First-Year Player Draft in 1965. These additional picks are provided when a team loses a particularly valuable free agent in the prior off-season, or, more recently, if a team fails to sign a draft pick from the previous year. The Angels have failed to sign one of their first-round picks, Alan Bannister (1969), but received no compensation. The franchise has made the first overall selection twice, in 1975 and 1995.

Key

Selections

See also

Los Angeles Angels of Anaheim minor league players

Footnotes
 Through the 2012 draft, free agents were evaluated by the Elias Sports Bureau and rated "Type A", "Type B", or not compensation-eligible. If a team offered arbitration to a player but that player refused and subsequently signed with another team, the original team was able to receive additional draft picks. If a "Type A" free agent left in this way, his previous team received a supplemental pick and a compensatory pick from the team with which he signed. If a "Type B" free agent left in this way, his previous team received only a supplemental pick. Since the 2013 draft, free agents are no longer classified by type; instead, compensatory picks are only awarded if the team offered its free agent a contract worth at least the average of the 125 current richest MLB contracts. However, if the free agent's last team acquired the player in a trade during the last year of his contract, it is ineligible to receive compensatory picks for that player.
 Goodwin was also selected first overall in the 1971 draft by the Chicago White Sox, but instead opted for four years of college.
 The Angels lost their first-round pick in 1979 to the San Francisco Giants as compensation for signing free agent Jim Barr.
 The Angels lost their original first-round pick in 1980 to the Pittsburgh Pirates as compensation for signing free agent Bruce Kison, but received a compensatory first-round pick from the Houston Astros for losing free agent Nolan Ryan.
 The Angels gained a compensatory first-round pick in 1985 from the Baltimore Orioles as compensation for losing free agent Fred Lynn.
 The Angels gained a compensatory first-round pick in 1986 from the Baltimore Orioles as compensation for losing free agent Juan Beníquez.
 The Angels gained a compensatory first-round pick in 1986 from the New York Yankees as compensation for losing free agent Al Holland.
 The Angels gained a supplemental first-round pick in 1986 for losing free agent Juan Beníquez.
 The Angels gained a supplemental first-round pick in 1986 for losing free agent Al Holland.
 The Angels gained a supplemental first-round pick in 1987 for losing free agent Reggie Jackson.
 The Angels lost their first-round pick in 1990 to the Montreal Expos as compensation for signing free agent Mark Langston.
 The Angels gained a supplemental first-round pick in 1991 for losing free agent Chili Davis.
 The Angels gained a supplemental first-round pick in 1992 for losing free agent Wally Joyner.
 The Angels lost their first-round pick in 1996 to the New York Yankees as compensation for signing free agent Randy Velarde.
 The Angels lost their first-round pick in 1999 to the Boston Red Sox as compensation for signing free agent Mo Vaughn.
 The Angels gained a compensatory first-round pick in 2000 from the Oakland Athletics as compensation for losing free agent Mike Magnante.
 The Angels gained a supplemental first-round pick in 2001 for losing free agent Mark Petkovsek.
 The Angels lost their original first-round pick in 2005 to the Boston Red Sox as compensation for signing free agent Orlando Cabrera, but received a supplemental first-round pick for losing free agent Troy Percival.
 The Angels lost their original first-round pick in 2007 to the Texas Rangers as compensation for signing free agent Gary Matthews Jr., but received a supplemental first-round pick for losing free agent Adam Kennedy.
 The Angels lost their first-round pick in 2008 to the Minnesota Twins as compensation for signing free agent Torii Hunter.
 The Angels gained a compensatory first-round pick in 2009 from the New York Mets as compensation for losing free agent Francisco Rodríguez.
 The Angels gained a compensatory first-round pick in 2009 from the New York Yankees as compensation for losing free agent Mark Teixeira.
 The Angels gained picks 40, 42, and 48 in the 2009 supplemental round for losing free agents Mark Teixeira, Francisco Rodríguez, and Jon Garland, respectively.
 The Angels gained a compensatory first-round pick in 2010 from the Seattle Mariners as compensation for losing free agent Chone Figgins.
 The Angels gained a compensatory first-round pick in 2010 from the Boston Red Sox as compensation for losing free agent John Lackey.
 The Angels gained picks 37 and 40 in the 2010 supplemental round for losing free agents Chone Figgins and John Lackey, respectively.
 The Angels lost their first-round pick in 2012 to the St. Louis Cardinals as compensation for signing free agent Albert Pujols.

References 
General references

In-text citations

External links 
Los Angeles Angels official website

First-round draft picks
Major League Baseball first-round draft picks